Jimmy James may refer to:

Entertainment
 Jimmy James (comedian) (1892–1965), British comedian
 Jimmy James (dancer) (1915–1992), New Zealand dancer
 Jimmy James (singer) (born 1940), British soul singer with The Vagabonds
 Jimmy James (musician) (born 1959), American guitarist with Tommy Tutone
 Jimmy James and the Blue Flames, a short-lived band led by Jimi Hendrix
 "Jimmy James" (song), a 1992 Beastie Boys song
 Jimmy James, a NewsRadio character portrayed by Stephen Root

Military
 Jimmy James, the nickname of Bertram James (1915–2008), RAF officer who survived "The Great Escape"
 Jimmy James, the nickname of Hugh James (1922–2015)

Australian trackers
Jimmy James (tracker, died 1945)
Jimmy James (tracker, 1913-1991)

Other
 J. R. James (1912–1980), British town planner
 N. D. G. James (1912–1993), English historian of forestry
 Jimmy James (aviator), flew the first package for Western Air Express

See also 
 James James (1833–1902), Welsh harpist
 James Alton James (1864–1962), American educator and historian
 Jim James (born 1978), American vocalist for band My Morning Jacket

James, Jimmy